The vice-president of Tanzania holds the second-highest political office in the United Republic of Tanzania. The vice president runs on a single ticket with the President of Tanzania, and ranks first in the presidential line of succession.

Per Article 37 of the Constitution of Tanzania, if the president dies, resigns, is permanently incapacitated, or is disqualified, the vice-president ascends to the presidency for the balance of the term. Under Article 40, a vice-president who ascends to the presidency in this manner is eligible to run for two full terms in their own right if there are fewer than three years remaining in the five-year term. If the vice-president ascends with more than three years remaining, they are only eligible for one full term.

For example, when Samia Suluhu became the first vice-president to directly ascend to the presidency, she did so only one year after being reelected as the running mate of her predecessor, John Magufuli. While she would be eligible to run for a full term in 2025, if she won she would have to leave office in 2030.

List of vice-presidents of Tanzania

After the union between Tanganyika and the People's Republic of Zanzibar and Pemba to form the United Republic of Tanzania in 1964, Tanzania had two vice-presidents, First and Second until the creation of a single office in 1995.

See also
President of Tanzania

References

External links
Official website

 
Politics of Tanzania
Tanzania
1964 establishments in Tanzania